Hector Brisbane (1904-1963) was a New Zealand professional rugby league footballer who represented New Zealand.

Playing career
Brisbane played for the Marist Old Boys in the Auckland Rugby League competition debuting in 1923. He had previously played for Ellerslie United as a junior.

In 1924, Brisbane represented Auckland City against the touring Great Britain Lions. He then made his debut for New Zealand, becoming Kiwi number 153.

He was a part of the 1926–27 New Zealand rugby league tour of Great Britain, which was marred by the strike action by six of the forwards including Marist teammate Arthur Singe. 

During the 1932 New Zealand rugby league season, Brisbane captained New Zealand to a 0–3 series defeat by Great Britain on the 1932 Great Britain Lions tour. In the third test, Brisbane scored two tries but New Zealand lost 18–20.

At the end of the 1934 season Brisbane had decided to retire and Marist played a benefit match in his honour against Newton Rangers.

Personal life and death
Hec Brisbane was the son of Julia and William Brisbane. He had an older sister Hazel Evelyn (b.1902), a younger brother Albert (b.1906) and a younger sister Zena (b.1913). His father William died in 1925. Hec married Christina Slater Brisbane in 1940. She died in 1957. Brisbane remarried Helena Ann Ganley Brisbane whose first husband had died in 1956. Hec Brisbane died on March 26, 1963 and was buried at Waikaraka Cemetery in Onehunga. His second wife Helena died in 1967. His mother Julia died in 1968 aged 87.

References

New Zealand rugby league players
New Zealand national rugby league team players
Auckland rugby league team players
Marist Saints players
North Island rugby league team players
Rugby league centres
New Zealand national rugby league team captains
1904 births
1963 deaths